Odontosabula is a genus of flies in the family Xylophagidae.

Species
Odontosabula czerskii (Pleske, 1925)
Odontosabula decora Nagatomi, 1985
Odontosabula fulvipilosa Nagatomi, 1985
Odontosabula gloriosa Matsumura, 1905
Odontosabula licenti (Séguy, 1952)

References

Xylophagidae
Brachycera genera
Taxa named by Shōnen Matsumura
Diptera of Asia